Arno Suislep (born 6 May 1980) is an Estonian musician.

Career 

Arno Suislep is best known from the Estonian local spin off from Pop Idol called Eesti otsib superstaari, where he got second place after Jana Kask. He got 47.1% of points in a tight competition.

He plays bass guitar in the band Melotrap.

References 

1980 births
Living people
21st-century Estonian male singers
Estonian pop singers
Idols (franchise) participants